Katsura Maru Number Two was a Japanese auxiliary gunboat built as a merchant ship at Urabe in 1937 and requisitioned by the Imperial Japanese Navy prior to the commencement of World War II.

References

Naval ships of Japan
1937 ships
Ships built in Japan